Giuseppe Puglia (1600–1636) was an Italian painter, born in Rome.  He was also known as Giuseppe del Bastaro. According to Baglioni, flourished chiefly during the pontificate of Urban VIII. There are several of his works in churches at Rome, including a Presentation in the Temple, in the cloister of the Padri della Minerva ; and an altarpiece in the church of Santa Maria Maggiore, representing The Virgin appears to Giovanni Patrizi. In the church of San Girolamo there are a Descent from the Cross and a St. Jerome. He died at Rome .

References

1640 deaths
Painters from Rome
17th-century Italian painters
Italian male painters
Italian Baroque painters
1600 births